This page provides supplementary chemical data on nitromethane.

Material Safety Data Sheet  

The handling of this chemical may incur notable safety precautions. MSDS is available from Mallinckrodt Baker.

Structure and properties

Thermodynamic properties

Vapor pressure of liquid

Table data obtained from CRC Handbook of Chemistry and Physics 44th ed.

Distillation data

Spectral data

References

Cited sources

Further reading
 

Chemical data pages
Chemical data pages cleanup